Margarella whiteana is a species of sea snail, a marine gastropod mollusk in the family Calliostomatidae, the top snails.

Distribution
This marine species occurs off the Antarctic Peninsula at depths between 3 m and 28 m.

Description 
The animal itself is a pale yellow in color. It has two pairs of short cephalic tentacles with large black eyes on the posterior side of the tentacles.

The shell is small, and wider than it is tall, at up to 7.6mm in height and 8.7 in diameter. The shell is covered in many spiral ribs, and lacks a periostracum. The maximum recorded shell length is 8.7 mm.

Habitat 
Minimum recorded depth is 3 m. Maximum recorded depth is 28 m.

References

 Linse, K. 2002. The shelled Magellanic Mollusca: with special reference to biogeographic relations in the Southern Ocean. Theses Zoologicae 34: [iv] + vii + 252 pp. A. R. G. Gantner: Ruggell, Lichtenstein.

External links

whiteana
Gastropods described in 2002